Stadtwerketurm is a chimney of Duisburg. It was built in 1966–67 and consists of four tubes. One of these tubes contains an elevator, the others are used for smoke guiding. It Stands at least more than 7 metres tall.

External links

http://www.skyscraperpage.com/cities/?buildingID=47836

Chimneys in Germany
Buildings and structures in Duisburg
1967 establishments in Germany
Towers completed in 1967